Bezbina    is a small town in Akkar Governorate, Lebanon.

The population in Bezbina is mainly Greek Orthodox Christians and Sunni Muslims.

History
In 1838, Eli Smith noted  the village, called Bzebina, located east of esh-Sheikh Mohammed. The inhabitants were Sunni Muslim, Greek Orthodox Christians and Maronites.

References

Bibliography

External links
Bezbina (Aakkar), Localiban 

Populated places in Akkar District
Sunni Muslim communities in Lebanon
Eastern Orthodox Christian communities in Lebanon